Clavus dolichurus is a species of sea snail, a marine gastropoda mollusk in the family Drilliidae.

Original description
 Stahlschmidt P., Poppe G.T. & Tagaro S.P. (2018). Descriptions of remarkable new turrid species from the Philippines. Visaya. 5(1): 5-64 page(s): 14, pl. 10 figs 1-2.

References

External links

 Worms Link

dolichurus
Gastropods described in 2018